Peggy was built at Calcutta in 1793 and initially sailed in the Indian coastal and Far East trade. In 1801 she assumed British registry and her name was changed to Juliana. Her owners sold her to the Transport Board but in 1804 the government resold her and she was sailing as a West Indiaman between London and Antigua. She then made two voyages for the British East India Company (EIC), and one voyage to Hobart, Van Dieman's Land, transporting convicts. On her return from this voyage she wrecked in 1821 on the English coast.

Career
Juliana was accepted into the Registry of Great Britain on 14 December 1801. She was sold to the Government for service with the Transport Board.

Juliana entered Lloyd's Register for 1805 with F. Smith, master, Boyd, owner, and trade London-Antigua. She also enters the Register of Shipping in 1805, but with Bourne, master, Beatson, owner, and location London. In 1806 the information in the Register of Shipping matches that in Lloyd's Register.

On 15 February 1808  captured near Barbados the French privateer brig . Malvina was commanded by René Salaun and carried 14 guns and 60 men. She had been travelling with her prize, the British ship Juliana, which Guerriere recaptured.

Lloyd's Register for 1810 shows Julianas master changing from F. Smith to Toussaint, her owner from Boyd & Co. to Thomas & Co., and her trade from London—Antigua to London—Bengal. In 1810 the EIC chartered Juliana for one voyage. On her return it chartered her for a second voyage.

First EIC voyage (1810–1811): Captain Jeremiah Richard James Toussaint acquired a letter of marque on 7 April 1810. He sailed from Portsmouth on 11 May 1810, bound for Bengal. Juliana was at Madeira on 27 May. They were under the escort of the frigate , which was going out to serve in the East Indies. Juliana reached Madras on 12 October, and arrived at Calcutta on 1 December. Homeward bound she was at Saugor on 26 January 1811, reached St Helena on 11 May St Helena, and arrived at the Downs on 13 July.

Second EIC voyage (1812–1813): Captain Richard Rawes acquired a letter of marque on 27 April 1812. He sailed from Falmouth on 15 May 1812, bound for Batavia, by then in English hands. Juliana reached Madeira on 3 June. Juliana arrived at Batavia on 30 September. Homeward bound, she reached the Cape of Good Hope on 19 March 1813 and St Helena on 10 April, and arrived at the Downs on 10 August.

The EIC released Juliana from service, and Tibbitt & Co. purchased her for private trade to India under a licence from the EIC. He had applied for a licence on 22 May 1815 and had received it on 31 March.

On 18 May 1820, a heavy gale drove Juliana, Ogilvie, master, coming from Penang, out of the Downs and into the North Sea, costing her two anchors and cables. She returned three days later and received replacement anchors and cables from Ransgate.

Convict transport (1820): In 1820 Juliana transported convicts to Hobart. She left on 3 September 1820 and arrived at Hobart on 28 December. She embarked 160 male convicts, one of whom died en route.

The Register of Shipping for 1821–22 showed Juliana with Ogilvie, master, Palmer, owner, and trade London—New South Wales.

Fate
On 23 December 1821 a gale blew Juliana, Ogilvie, master, from Bengal, out of the Ramsgate Roads and cost her two anchors and a cable. She sent a boat to shore to get replacements, and the boat was supposed to deliver them on the evening tide. However, Juliana was wrecked on  the Kentish Knock at the mouth of the River Thames. Forty lives were lost; there were only two survivors.

Notes

Citations

References
 
 

 
 

1793 ships
British ships built in India
Ships of the British East India Company
Convict ships to Tasmania
Age of Sail merchant ships
Merchant ships of the United Kingdom
Maritime incidents in December 1821